Maximillian Lu is an American chess player. Lu was the former youngest United States Chess Federation member to attain a master rating. At approximately nine-years and eleven-months of age Maximillian beat the previous record by twelve days.  About a year later, this record was broken by Christopher Yoo.

List of tournament wins

2013 Fide North American Youth Chess Championship, Toronto, Canada, under-8, 1st place – received Fide Candidate Master title.

2013 Fide World Youth Chess Championship, Al-Ain, UAE, 4th place, under-8, top U.S. finisher.

2014 Fide North American Youth Chess Championship, Tarrytown, New York, under-10, 1st place.

2015 USCF K-3 National Blitz Champion, 1st place.

2015 US Chess Federation Grade Nationals, 4th Grade National Champion, 1st place.

2017 Fide North American Youth Chess Championship, under-12, 1st place.

External links

References

2005 births
American chess players
Living people
People from Greenwich, Connecticut